Georgios Liveris (born 10 May 1932) is a Greek former sports shooter. He competed in the 50 metre rifle, three positions and 50 metre rifle, prone events at the 1960 Summer Olympics.

References

1932 births
Living people
Greek male sport shooters
Olympic shooters of Greece
Shooters at the 1960 Summer Olympics
Panathinaikos shooters
Sportspeople from Athens